A silique or siliqua (plural siliques or siliquae) is a type of fruit (seed capsule) having two fused carpels with the length being more than three times the width. When the length is less than three times the width of the dried fruit it is referred to as a silicle. The outer walls of the ovary (the valves) usually separate when ripe, then being named dehiscent, and leaving a persistent partition (the replum). Siliques are present in many members of the mustard family, Brassicaceae, but some species have silicles instead. Some species closely related to plants with true siliques have fruits with a similar structure that do not open when ripe; these are usually called indehiscent siliques (compare dehiscence).

See also
 Legume – a fruit type that somewhat resembles a silique, but is derived from one carpel that typically splits along two sides.

References

Fruit morphology